Fort Stockton Independent School District is a public school district based in Fort Stockton, Texas, United States. The superintendent of schools is Dr. Gabriel Zamora.

History 
The Fort Stockton Independent School District was created in 1917 by the Texas Legislature by HB 59, Special Sessions Acts of 1917, and was organized on October 12, 1917.

The construction of the former Fort Stockton High School, on Oklahoma Street, which initiated the legislation, was completed and the school was initiated in February 1917 with C.V. Compton as superintendent.

Superintendents 
Superintendents of schools in the Fort Stockton Independent School District have been:

 C.V. Compton (1917-1922)
 J.W. Head (1922-1925)
 G.W. Page (1926-1927)
 H.H. Crain (1927-1929)
 V.A. Byrd	(1929-1931)
 J.F. Reeves (1931-1942)
 M.E. Fincher (1942-1947)
 E.W. (Ike) Smith (1947-1953)
 James G. Huckaby (1953-1974)
 Otto W. Langlois (1974-1976)
 Jon Miller Ryan (1976-?)
 Ralph Traynham (2009-2021)
 Gabriel Zamora (2021-incumbent)

Academics
In 2009, the school district was rated "academically acceptable" by the Texas Education Agency.

Schools
Fort Stockton High School (grades 9-12)
Fort Stockton Middle School (grades 6-8)
Fort Stockton Intermediate (grades 4-5)
Alamo Elementary (grades PPCD, PCD, kindergarten-grade 3)
Apache Elementary (prekindergarten-grade 3)

References

External links
 
 Fort Stockton ISD (Archive)

School districts in Pecos County, Texas
Fort Stockton, Texas
School districts established in 1917